Bortala may refer to:

Bortala Mongol Autonomous Prefecture, a prefecture in Xinjiang, China
Bole, Xinjiang, a city in Bortala Mongol Autonomous Prefecture
Bortala River, the main affluent of the Aibi Lake